The men's elite road race at the 2021 European Road Championships took place on 12 September 2021, in Trentino, Italy. Nations were allowed to enter between 1 and 8 riders into the event, dependent on UCI rankings.

Results

References

Men's elite road race